Joseph M. Young is an American diplomat who served as the chargé d'affaires ad interim at the U.S. Embassy Tokyo from July 22, 2019, to June 17, 2021, after the resignation of Bill Hagerty. Young is a career member of the U.S. Foreign Service and served as the Deputy Chief of Mission at the  U.S. Embassy in Tokyo from 2017 to 2019, and as the Director for Japanese Affairs at the United States Department of State from 2012 to 2014.

Education
Young earned a bachelor's degree in classics at the Collegio Borromeo and a Master of Science in foreign service at the Georgetown University School of Foreign Service.

References

Living people
Year of birth missing (living people)
20th-century American diplomats
21st-century American diplomats
Ambassadors of the United States to Japan
Walsh School of Foreign Service alumni
United States Foreign Service personnel
University of Pavia alumni